Eretmocera percnophanes is a moth of the family Scythrididae. It was described by Edward Meyrick in 1929. It is found in the Philippines (Samar).

The wingspan is about 13 mm. The forewings are dark purple-blue-fuscous and the hindwings are dark coppery-fuscous.

References

percnophanes
Moths described in 1929